Jimmy Wayne Tolleson (born November 22, 1955) is an American former professional baseball infielder who played for the Texas Rangers, Chicago White Sox, and New York Yankees of Major League Baseball (MLB).

Western Carolina University
A star high school athlete in both baseball and football, Tolleson said he chose to attend Western Carolina University over other schools because it was the only program that would allow him to play both sports "with no strings attached."

Tolleson first attracted the attention of baseball scouts while playing college ball at Western Carolina. In 1978, he was named Southern Conference Baseball Player of the Year, SoCon Athlete of the Year and was an All-NCAA Atlantic Region selection. He was also a member of the Southern Conference's 75th Anniversary team.

Tolleson was also a star football player at WCU, catching 105 passes for 1,747 yards and 14 touchdowns over two seasons. He was named All-Southern Conference as a wide receiver after leading both the conference and the NCAA Division I in receiving in 1977 with 73 catches for 1,101 yards and seven touchdowns. In 1977, he was WCU's emergency placekicker and was a perfect 6-of-6 on field goals, and connected on 22 of 24 extra point kicks.

At the first-ever Canadian-American Bowl in Tampa, Florida, Tolleson returned the opening kickoff.

Texas Rangers
The Pittsburgh Pirates chose Tolleson in the 12th round of the 1977 Major League Baseball Draft, but he decided to return to school for his senior year rather than sign with Pittsburgh. The Texas Rangers chose Tolleson with the 202nd pick of the 1978 Major League Baseball Draft, and this time he signed.

He debuted with the Rangers on September 1 against the Toronto Blue Jays, pinch hitting in the seventh inning and remaining in the game at shortstop.

He displayed excellent speed and good defense, totaling 55 stolen bases in the two seasons, but he also struggled to maintain an acceptable batting average and he never hit for much power.

Wayne was involved in a memorable 1983 bench clearing brawl at Arlington Stadium with California Angels player Bobby Grich.

In , he shifted into a utility infielder role, receiving most of his playing time at short as the Rangers reacquired Toby Harrah to play second during the off season. Tolleson responded by batting .313 with a solid .733 On-base plus slugging Percentage, both career bests by far.

Chicago White Sox and New York Yankees
Tolleson is often identified with the brief, disappointing tenure of Ken Harrelson as general manager of the Chicago White Sox, due to his involvement in two of Harrelson's iconic trades.

On November 25, the Rangers traded Tolleson and relief pitcher Dave Schmidt to the White Sox in exchange for shortstops Scott Fletcher and José Mota and pitching prospect Ed Correa.

He was a member of the White Sox for only a few months, as Chicago sent him to the New York Yankees in another deal on July 30, . In addition to Tolleson, the White Sox shipped out former All-Star Ron Kittle and backup catcher Joel Skinner, acquiring first baseman/third baseman Carlos Martínez and catchers Ron Hassey and Bill Lindsey.

Personal life
Wayne and his wife Kimberly have two sons, Steve and Clint. Steve also played in Major League Baseball.

Wayne's father, Jim, played seven seasons in the minor leagues for the Cleveland Indians, Boston Red Sox and Detroit Tigers, and his brother, Michael, played one season in the Indians organization.

References

External links

1955 births
Living people
Major League Baseball infielders
Texas Rangers players
Chicago White Sox players
New York Yankees players
Baseball players from South Carolina
Western Carolina Catamounts baseball players
Western Carolina Catamounts football players
Asheville Tourists players
Columbus Clippers players
Denver Bears players
Fort Lauderdale Yankees players
Tulsa Drillers players
Wichita Aeros players